Badminton at the 1987 Southeast Asian Games was held at Kuningan Hall, Jakarta, Indonesia. Badminton events was held between 10 and 19 September.

Medal winners

Final results

Medal table

References 

1987
1987 Southeast Asian Games
1987 in badminton
Badminton tournaments in Indonesia
Sports competitions in Jakarta